Eevert Kerttula (3 July 1894 – 23 August 1962) was a Finnish gymnast. He competed in nine events at the 1924 Summer Olympics.

References

External links
 

1894 births
1962 deaths
Finnish male artistic gymnasts
Olympic gymnasts of Finland
Gymnasts at the 1924 Summer Olympics
Sportspeople from Leningrad Oblast
20th-century Finnish people